Laban Kagika (born July 17, 1978) is a male long-distance runner from Kenya, who won the Hokkaido Marathon in 2004. He set his personal best (2:10:24) in the men's marathon race in the 2001 edition of the Fukuoka Marathon.

Laban has also started training young athletes in his home in Nyahururu.

Achievements

External links
marathoninfo

1978 births
Living people
Kenyan male long-distance runners
Kenyan male marathon runners
20th-century Kenyan people
21st-century Kenyan people